Amerzgane is a commune in the Ouarzazate Province of the Souss-Massa-Drâa administrative region of Morocco. At the time of the 2004 census, the commune had a total population of 7,593 people living in 1,290 households. However, these numbers have since grown; in the 2014 Moroccan census, Amerzgane had a total population of 8,820 people across 1,656 households. These numbers are composed almost entirely of native Moroccans, with the 2014 census reporting only one foreign citizen as a part of the population.

References

Populated places in Ouarzazate Province
Rural communes of Drâa-Tafilalet